Phenomenology within sociology, or phenomenological sociology, is the study of the formal structures of concrete social existence as made available in and through the analytical description of acts of intentional consciousness. The object of such an analysis is the meaningful lived world of everyday life ( or "Lifeworld"). The task of phenomenological sociology is to account for, or describe, the formal structures of the given object of investigation in terms of subjectivity, as an object-constituted-in-and-for-consciousness. This is distinct from other social science descriptions in the utilization of phenomenological methods.

Context
Social phenomenologists talk about the social construction of reality. They view social order as a creation of everyday interaction, often looking at conversations to find the methods that people use to maintain social relations.

The leading exponent of Phenomenological Sociology was Alfred Schütz (1899–1959). Schütz sought to provide a critical philosophical foundation for Max Weber's interpretive sociology (verstehende Soziologie) by applying methods and insights derived from the phenomenological philosophy of Edmund Husserl (1859–1938) to the study of the social world. It is the building of this bridge between Husserlian phenomenology and Weberian sociology that serves as the starting point for contemporary phenomenological sociology.

Not all versions of phenomenological sociology are based on Weberian themes. In point of fact, there is some historical evidence that would suggest that elements of Weberian sociology are themselves based on certain phenomenological themes; especially in regard to the theory of the intended meaning of an act, and ideas regarding theory and concept formation. Weber may have taken influence from Wilhelm Dilthey's theory of Weltanschauung, who may have also taken from Husserl's theory of meaning.

Husserl's work was conducted as a transcendental phenomenology of consciousness. Schütz's work was conducted as a mundane phenomenology of the social world. The difference in their respective projects rests at the level of analysis, the objects taken as a topic of study, and the type of phenomenological reduction that is employed for the purposes of analysis.

Ultimately these two distinct phenomenological projects should be seen as complementary, with the structures of the latter dependent on the structures of the former. That is, valid phenomenological descriptions of the formal structures of the life-world should be wholly consistent with the descriptions of the formal structures of intentional consciousness. It is from the latter that the former derives its validity, verifiability, and truth value. This is in keeping with Husserl's conception of phenomenology as "First Philosophy", the foundation, or ground, for both philosophy and all of the sciences.

Core assumptions

The general thesis of the natural attitude is the ideational foundation for the fact-world of our straightforward, common sense social experience . It unites the world of individual objects into a unified world of meaning, which we assume is shared by any and all who share our culture. It forms the underpinning for our thoughts and actions. It is the projected assumption, or belief, in a naturally occurring social world that is both factually objective in its existential status, and unquestioned in its "natural" appearance; social objects (persons, language, institutions, etc.) have the same existential "thing" status as objects occurring in nature (rocks, trees, and animals, etc.).

Although it is often referred to as the "General Thesis of the Natural Attitude", it is not a thesis in the formal sense of the term, but a non-thematic assumption, or belief, that underlies our sense of the objectivity and facticity of the world, and the objects appearing in this world. The facticity of this world of common sense is both unquestioned and virtually "unquestionable;" it is sanctionable as to its status as that which "is," and that which "everyone," or, at least, "any reasonable person," agrees to be the case with regard to the factual character of the world.

As far as traditional social science is concerned, this taken-for-granted world of social facts is the starting and end point for any and all investigations of the social world. It provides the raw, observable, taken-for-granted "data" upon which the findings of the social sciences are idealized, conceptualized, and offered up for analysis and discourse. Within traditional social science, this "data" is formulated into a second order world of abstractions and idealizations constituted in accordance with these sciences' pre-determined interpretive schemes.

Schutz's phenomenological descriptions are made from within the phenomenological attitude, after the phenomenological reduction (epoche), which serves to suspend this assumption, or belief, and reveal the phenomena occurring within the natural attitude as objects-for-consciousness.

The stock of knowledge 
The term “stock of knowledge” was coined by Schütz. This concept is vital to phenomenological sociologists and their claim that social reality is intersubjective. While phenomenologists tend to focus on establishing the structures of “intentional consciousness,” as Husserl calls it, proponents of phenomenological sociology are interested in the structures of the “lifeworld.” The latter refers to the world as directly experienced through the subjectivity of everyday life. As we go through our everyday lives, we draw on our stocks of knowledge to make interpretations. The "stock of knowledge” is typically a "deep background configuration" of a series of past experiences comprising: "one’s native language and linguistic rules; conventional modes of interpreting expressions and events; numerous theories and methods; aural and visual forms; shared cultural and normative understandings, and the like." Schütz argued that all "interpretation of this world is based upon a stock of previous experiences of it."

Reduction

Martin Heidegger characterizes Husserl's phenomenological research project as, "the analytic description of intentionality in its a priori;" as it is the phenomenon of intentionality which provides the mode of access for conducting any and all phenomenological investigations, and the ultimate ground or foundation guaranteeing any findings resulting from any such inquiry. In recognizing consciousness as having the formal structure of intentionality, as always having consciousness of an intended object, Husserlian phenomenology has located the access point to a radical new form of scientific description.

Methodologically, access to this field is obtained through the phenomenological reduction. While there is some controversy as to the official name, number, and levels of the reduction, this internal argument among the philosophers need not concern us. For the purposes of a mundane phenomenology of the social world, we, as phenomenological social scientists, engage in a mundane phenomenological reduction called the Epoché. The hallmark of this form of the reduction is what it reveals about its field of inquiry: a mundane phenomenology of the social world defines its phenomenal field as the intersubjective region of mundane consciousness as appearing from within the natural attitude.

The phenomenological reduction as applied to a mundane analysis of the social world consists of the bracketing [equivalents: methodical disregard, putting out of play, suspension] of the thesis of the natural attitude. This bracketing is nothing more than a bracketing of the existential belief in the existence of the objective world; the existential status of the world itself is not called into question. The result of this bracketing is that our attention is shifted from the objects in the world as they occur in nature, to the objects in the world as they appear for consciousness - as phenomenon for intentional consciousness. Our descriptions of objects in the world are now transformed from the naive descriptions of objects as occurring in nature, to phenomenological descriptions of objects as appearing for consciousness. In short, for the purpose of a mundane phenomenological analysis within the natural attitude, the epoche transforms objects as occurring in nature into: objects-for-subjectivity, objects-for-consciousness, objects-as-intended.

Keep in mind that for positivism, the meaning of an object is, by definition, "objective". That is, the meaning of the object is a property of the object itself, is independent of any particular observer, and "the same" for any and all observers regardless of their orientation or perspective. For phenomenology, an object is always intended, and constituted, as meaningful by a particular intending subject from a particular orientation and from a particular perspectival viewing point. In addition, phenomenologically speaking, the meaning of the object cannot be separated from its phenomenality, or materiality, and cannot be constituted qua meaningful object without the meaning bestowing act of intending on the part of a constituting subject.

For a phenomenology undertaken within the natural attitude, meaning does not inherently accrue to an object as a thing-in-itself, is not an "add-on" to the object (a label), and is not separable from the object as constituted by the intending subject in the act of meaning constitution. For phenomenology, the meaning and the object (in its "materiality") are co-constituted in the intending of the object by the subject—phenomenologically speaking there are only meaningful objects. There is no such thing as a neutrally valued object,  or a meaningless object, and the notion of an object as "nonsense" is itself a meaningful determination - as the existentialists would say, we are condemned to meaning.

Note that, because we as observers have already been born into an already-existing social world that is already pre-interpreted - through both social meanings and through architectural and business intentionality - and 'made meaningful-to-us' as an intersubjectively available "entity", any proposal that the subject is creating the object, or creating the meaning of the object as an individual achievement in a particular situation is a misrepresentation of what is actually taking place. Within the 'Natural Attitude of Everyday Life', the subject's role in the constitution of meaningful objects is better understood as a reading off, or interpretation, of the meaning from the object-as-intended. This reading off, or interpretation, of the object's meaning is an intersubjective achievement of the intending subject that takes place within the intersubjective realm of the natural attitude.

See also 
 Conversation analysis
 Ethnomethodology

References

Bibliography 

Barber, Michael D. "Alfred Schutz," Stanford Encyclopedia of Philosophy. Web. — Touches on the phenomenological sociology.
Natanson, Maurice, and Edmund Husserl. 1974. Philosopher of Infinite Tasks. Evanston, IL: Northwestern University Press. Paperback. — Provides sociologists with an introduction to phenomenology.
Schutz, Alfred. 1967. The Phenomenology of the Social World. Evanston, IL: Northwestern University Press. Paperback. — Touches on the phenomenological method.
Smith, Davis Woodruff. "Phenomenology," Stanford Encyclopedia of Philosophy. Web. — Provides an introduction to phenomenology.
Sokolowski, Robert. 2000. Introduction to Phenomenology. New York: Cambridge University Press. Paperback. — Touches on the phenomenological method.
Wender, Jonathan. 2001. “Phenomenology, Cultural Criminology and the Return to Astonishment.” Pp. 49–60 in Cultural Criminology Unleashed, edited by J. Ferrell, K. Hayward, W. Morrison, and M. Presdee. London: Routledge.
Zaner, R. M. 2010. "Editorial Introduction." Pp. xv–xxxv in The Collected Works of Aron Gurwitsch, V.III. New York: Springer. — Touches on the phenomenological method.

Phenomenology
Sociological theories
Philosophy of social science